Sodium cyanate (NaOCN) is a white crystalline solid that adopts a body centered rhombohedral crystal lattice structure (trigonal crystal system) at room temperature.

Preparation

Sodium cyanate is prepared industrially by the reaction of urea with sodium carbonate at elevated temperature. 
2OC(NH2)2 + Na2CO3 → 2Na(NCO) + CO2 + 2NH3 + H2O
It can also be prepared in the laboratory by oxidation of a cyanide in aqueous solution by a mild oxidizing agent such as lead oxide.

Chemical Uses
Sodium cyanate is an ideal nucleophile, and these nucleophilic properties make it a major contributor to the stereospecificity in certain reactions such as in the production of chiral oxazolidone.

Medical applications
Sodium cyanate is a useful reagent in producing asymmetrical urea derivatives that have a range of biological activity mostly in aryl isocyanate intermediates. Such intermediates as well as sodium cyanate have been used in medicine as a means of counterbalancing carcinogenic effects on the body, possibly helping people with sickle cell anemia, and blocking certain receptors for melanin which has been shown to help with obesity.

See also
 Cyanate

References

Cyanates
Sodium compounds